This section of the list of former state routes in New York contains all routes numbered above 401. To date, New York State Route 456 is the highest numbered former state route in New York.

References

 401